Denis Golubev (born July 11, 1991) is a Russian professional ice hockey player who currently plays for HC Sibir Novosibirsk of the Kontinental Hockey League (KHL).

References

External links 

1991 births
Living people
Ak Bars Kazan players
Amur Khabarovsk players
HC Lada Togliatti players
Russian ice hockey centres
People from Magnitogorsk
HC Sibir Novosibirsk players
Universiade medalists in ice hockey
Universiade gold medalists for Russia
Competitors at the 2011 Winter Universiade
Sportspeople from Chelyabinsk Oblast